Zhivi spokoyno, strana! is a sixteenth studio album by Russian singer Alla Pugacheva released in 2003 by Monolit Records.

Overview 
The album includes songs from the singer's current repertoire; most of them, however, were released earlier. Some songs were released on the split album A byl li malchik? by Pugacheva and singer Lyubasha, some from the previous album Rechnoy tramvaychik, and the song "Every night and every day" is generally represented by the version of 1985, which was published on the albums Watch Out and Alla Pugacheva v Stokgolme.

The Album was released in two versions: a standard CD and a gift two-disc edition (on the second disc there were music videos for songs "Byt ili ne byt" and "Vodyanye da leshiye").

Ahead of the album's release, a split single by Alla Pugacheva and Maxim Galkin, "Eto lyubov" (2002), was released. It featuring three duet songs: "Bud ili ne bud", "Eto lyubov" and "Kholodno".

Track listing

Sales and certifications

References

External links

2003 albums
Alla Pugacheva albums
Russian-language albums